Riikka Lehtonen (born 24 July 1979 in Kangasala, Finland) is a Finnish volleyball and beach volley player. She is the most successful female volleyball player in Finland. Lehtonen has played for several professional clubs in Finland, France, Italy, Japan, Turkey, Greece and Azerbaijan.

Since 2014 Lehtonen has competed in the FIVB Beach Volleyball World Tour with Taru Lahti.

Club honours 
 Finnish Championship: 1997, 1999, 2019
 Finnish Cup: 1996, 1997, 2013
 French Championship: 2002, 2003, 2004
French Cup: 2003, 2004
 Italian Championship: 2006
 Italian Cup: 2006
CEV Women's Champions League: 2002, 2003
CEV Women's Challenge Cup: 2008

References

External links 

1979 births
Living people
People from Kangasala
Olympiacos Women's Volleyball players
Finnish beach volleyball players
Finnish women's volleyball players
Beach volleyball players at the 2015 European Games
European Games competitors for Finland
Sportspeople from Pirkanmaa